A. vulgare may refer to:

 Armadillidium vulgare, the (common) pill-bug or (common) pill woodlouse, a widespread woodlouse species found in Europe
 Astrocaryum vulgare, the tucumã-do-Pará in Brazil, aouara in French Guiana or awarra in Suriname, a palm species native to Amazon

See also
 Vulgare